Saltwater Band are an Indigenous roots band from Galiwin'ku on Elcho Island, around 560 kilometres from Darwin. The members are Yolngu and they sing mostly in Yolngu languages. Their songs are a mixture of traditional songs and reggae/ska influenced pop. One member of the band, the late Geoffrey Gurrumul Yunupingu, is a close relative of Mandawuy Yunupingu of Yothu Yindi and was a past member of Yothu Yindi.

Saltwater Band's first album, Gapu Damurrun, sold more than 10,000 copies, a then record for an independent Northern Territory act. Their album Djarridjarri was nominated for the ARIA Award for Best World Music Album at the ARIA Music Awards of 2004. The album also received a Deadly Award for Album Release of the Year.

Discography

Awards and nominations

APRA Awards
The APRA Awards are presented annually from 1982 by the Australasian Performing Right Association (APRA), "honouring composers and songwriters".

|-
| 2012 || "Compass" (Charlie Yunupingu, David Yunupingu) || Blues & Roots Work of the Year ||

ARIA Music Awards
The ARIA Music Awards is an annual awards ceremony that recognises excellence, innovation, and achievement across all genres of Australian music.

|-
| 2004 
| Djarridjarri: Blue Flag
| Best World Music Album
| 
|-
| 2011
| Malk
| Best World Music Album 
|

The Deadly Awards
The Deadly Awards, commonly known simply as The Deadlys, was an annual celebration of Australian Aboriginal and Torres Strait Islander achievement in music, sport, entertainment and community. They ran from 1996 to 2013.

|-
| Deadly Awards 2004
| Djarridjarri
| Album of the Year
| 
|-
| Deadly Awards 2009
| themselves
| Band of the Year
| 
|-

National Indigenous Music Awards
The National Indigenous Music Awards recognise excellence, innovation and leadership among Aboriginal and Torres Strait Islander musicians from throughout Australia. They commenced in 2004. 

|-
| 2004
| themselves
| People's Choice Award
| 
|-
| 2005
| themselves
| People's Choice Award
| 
|-
| 2008
| Saltwater Band Live
| DVD/Film Clip of the Year
| 
|-
| 2011
| Malk
| Album of the Year
| 
|-

References 

Northern Territory musical groups
Indigenous Australian musical groups